Jeffreya is a genus of African flowering plants in the family Asteraceae.

Species
On Global Compositae Checklist;
 Jeffreya palustris (O.Hoffm.) Wild - Tanzania, Zambia, Zaire
 Jeffreya petitiana (Lisowski) Beentje - Burundi

Taxonomy
Species in homonymic genus
In 1978, Cabrera used the name Jeffreya to refer to a plant from Madagascar, rather different from the plant to which Wild had already applied the name four years earlier. This necessitated a renaming of Cabrera's species:
 Jeffreya decurrens (L.) Cabrera - Neojeffreya decurrens (L.) Cabrera

The genus name of Jeffreya is in honour of Charles Jeffrey (b. 1934), an English botanist at Kew Gardens with a focus on Chinese flora and also specialist in Asteraceae and Cucurbitaceae.

References

Asteraceae genera
Astereae